Jeff Peterson may refer to:

People
 Jeffrey Peterson (born 1972), American entrepreneur 
 Jeff Peterson (guitarist) (fl. 2000s), American guitarist

Other uses
 Jeff Peterson Memorial Cup, annual pro-wrestling event of Full Impact Pro

See also

 Geoff Peterson, sidekick character on The Late Late Show with Craig Ferguson
 Jeff Pedersen, a participant on season 1 of Newlyweds: The First Year
 Peterson (disambiguation)
 Jeff (disambiguation)